Gayatri Waterfalls is one of the many waterfalls around Adilabad, along with Kuntala Waterfall and Pochera Falls. Away from the human eye, the waterfalls found its habitat in a remote place inside a deep tropical forest. It is approximately 5 km from Tarnam Khurd, near Neredigonda of Adilabad district.

References

Waterfalls of Telangana
Adilabad district